Lactobacillus iners is a species in the genus Lactobacillus. It is a Gram-positive, catalase-negative, facultatively anaerobic rod-shaped bacterium with type strain CCUG 28746T. Lactobacillus iners is a  normal inhabitant of the lower reproductive tract in healthy women.

Genome 
The genomes of at least 15 strains have been sequenced and encode between 1,152 and 1,506 proteins. Thus, this species has one of the smallest Lactobacillus genomes compared to other species, such as L. crispatus, which typically encodes more than twice as many proteins.

References

Further reading

Macklaim, Jean M., et al. "At the crossroads of vaginal health and disease, the genome sequence of Lactobacillus iners AB-1." Proceedings of the National Academy of Sciences 108.Supplement 1 (2011): 4688–4695.
Alqumber, Mohammed A., et al. "A species-specific PCR for Lactobacillus iners demonstrates a relative specificity of this species for vaginal colonization."Microbial Ecology in Health and Disease 20.3 (2008): 135-139.

External links 

LPSN
Type strain of Lactobacillus iners at BacDive -  the Bacterial Diversity Metadatabase

Lactobacillaceae
Bacteria described in 1999